Gorica Gajić is a Serbian politician, currently serving her third term in the National Assembly of Serbia. She is a member of the New Democratic Party of Serbia (Nova demokratska stranka Srbije, NDSS), which was known until May 2022 as the Democratic Party of Serbia (Demokratska stranka Srbije, DSS).

Private life
Gajić is a graduated economist.

Politician
Gajić joined the DSS on its formation in 1992.

Member of the Federal Assembly (2004–06)
Gajić received the 119th position on the DSS's electoral list in the 2003 Serbian parliamentary election. The list won fifty-three seats, and she was not afterward included in the party's assembly delegation. (From 2000 to 2011, Serbian parliamentary mandates were awarded to sponsoring parties or coalitions rather than to individual candidates, and it was common practice for mandates to be assigned out of numerical order. Gajić could have been given a mandate despite her list position, but she was not.)

By virtue of its performance in the 2003 parliamentary election, the DSS had the right to appoint twenty members to the federal Assembly of Serbia and Montenegro in early 2004. Gajić was included in her party's delegation and served on the committee for internal economic affairs and finance. The federal assembly ceased to exist in 2006, when Montenegro declared independence.

Member of the National Assembly (2012–14, 2016–2020, 2022–)
The DSS contested the Serbian parliamentary elections of 2007 and 2008 in an electoral alliance with New Serbia (Nova Srbija, NS). Gajić was included on the coalition's electoral list both times but was not chosen for a mandate on either occasion.

Serbia's electoral system was reformed in 2011, such that parliamentary mandates were awarded in numerical order to candidates on successful lists. Gajić received the twenty-fourth position on the DSS's list in the 2012 parliamentary election and was not immediately elected when the party won twenty-one seats. After the resignation of candidates further up the list, she received a seat in the assembly on 26 July 2012. The Serbian Progressive Party (Srpska napredna stranka, SNS) won the election and afterward formed a coalition government with the Socialist Party of Serbia (Socijalistička partija Srbije, SPS) and other parties; the DSS served in opposition. During her first term in the republican assembly, Gajić was a member of the committee for spatial planning, transport, telecommunications, and infrastructure; a deputy member of the committee for labour, social affairs, social inclusion, and poverty reduction; and a member of the parliamentary friendship groups with France and Hungary.

She was promoted to the fifteenth position on the DSS's list for the 2014 election. On this occasion. the party's list did not cross the electoral threshold for representation in the assembly. She was chosen as a DSS vice-chair in October 2014, following longtime leader Vojislav Koštunica's resignation from the party.

The DSS contested the 2016 parliamentary election in alliance with Dveri. Gajić received the eighth position on their combined list and was elected to a second term when the list won thirteen seats. The SNS and its allies won a majority victory in this election, and the DSS again served in opposition. During the 2016–20 parliament, Gajić was a member of the committee on the economy, regional development, trade, tourism, and energy; a member of the committee on labour, social issues, social inclusion, and poverty reduction; a deputy member of the committee on the rights of the child and the committee on finance, state budget, and control of public spending; and a member of the parliamentary friendship groups with France, Greece, and Russia.

There was a serious split in the DSS in late 2016, following which Gajić, Milan Lapčević, and Dejan Šulkić were the only assembly members to remain with the party. Lapčević subsequently left as well. In 2019, Gajić criticized the parties of the Alliance for Serbia for boycotting the assembly, describing their decision as rushed and counterproductive.

The DSS created a new alliance called METLA 2020 for the 2020 Serbian parliamentary election, and Gajić appeared in the third position on its list. The list did not cross the electoral threshold. The following year, the DSS and the Movement for the Restoration of the Kingdom of Serbia (Pokret obnove Kraljevine Srbije, POKS) formed a coalition called the National Democratic Alternative (Nacionalno demokratska alternativa,, NADA). Gajić received the fourth position on the coalition's list in the 2022 parliamentary election and was re-elected when the list won fifteen seats. The Progressives and their allies once again won the election, and the DSS (now renamed as the NDSS) remains in opposition.

Gajić is a member of the committee on labour, social issues, social inclusion, and poverty reduction; and a deputy member of the health and family committee, the committee on the rights of the child, and the committee on education, science, technological development, and the information society.

Local politics
Gajić has served a number of terms in the Svilajnac municipal assembly. She the DSS's candidate for mayor in the 2004 Serbian local elections, in which mayors were directly elected. Although unsuccessful in that contest, she was chosen afterward as the municipality's deputy mayor and served in this role for the next four years.

Gajić appeared in the lead position on the DSS's list for Svilajnac in the 2012 Serbian local elections and was re-elected when the list won three mandates. She led a DSS–Dveri list in the 2016 local elections; this list did not cross the threshold. She returned to the municipal assembly in the 2020 Serbian local elections on the list of an alliance called "Only Forward Svilajnac," which won two seats.

Electoral record

Local (Svilajnac)

References

1958 births
Living people
People from Svilajnac
21st-century Serbian women politicians
21st-century Serbian politicians
Members of the National Assembly (Serbia)
Members of the Assembly of Serbia and Montenegro
Democratic Party of Serbia politicians
New Democratic Party of Serbia politicians
Women members of the National Assembly (Serbia)